Arielle Tepper is a theater and film producer, native New Yorker, and founder of the concierge service, WhatShouldWeDo?! She also serves as the Board Chair for The Public Theater in New York. Tepper has won six Tony Awards.

Early life
Arielle Tepper was born and raised in Manhattan's Upper East Side.  From the age of three, she attended The Dalton School in New York City, spending most of her summers in East Hampton.  Arielle's mother, Susan L. Tepper was an artist and her father, a self-employed commodities trader. 

At the age of eight, Arielle saw her first Broadway show, Annie, which she would later go on to produce.

After graduating from high school, she attended Syracuse University, majoring in Design and Technical Theater.

Career
In 1998, after graduating from Syracuse University, Tepper founded Arielle Tepper Productions, a theatrical production company to develop and produce plays and musicals both on and off Broadway. Her first production was John Leguizamo's Freak, a semi-autobiographical one-person play that ran for six months at the Cort Theater in New York.  

Arielle’s producing credits include the film Genius and many Broadway and Off-Broadway shows including: Les Liaisons Dangereuses, The Elephant Man starring Bradley Cooper, The Cripple of Inishmaan starring Daniel Radcliffe, Lucky Guy starring Tom Hanks, I’ll Eat You Last: A Chat with Sue Mengers starring Bette Midler, Annie, Hamlet starring Jude Law, Frost/Nixon, Monty Python’s Spamalot, and A Raisin in the Sun. 

In 2016, Arielle took a small step back from her production company to launch her newest venture, WhatShouldWeDo?!, a New York planning, recommendations, and booking service.

Philanthropy
In 2005, Tepper formed The Living Room for Artists, a not for profit 501(c)(3) organization whose aim is to sustain and support the Summer Play Festival which was first presented in 2004.  SPF formed an alliance with The Public Theater and had a relationship with the Donmar Warehouse through its creation of the Playwright Residency Program.

In 2001, in an effort to promote Theater Education,  she created The Tepper Center for Careers in Theatre which, through The Tepper Semester in New York provides opportunities for college seniors to develop specific strategies for pursuing their career goals in the entertainment industry. In 2005, she initiated a theater program for second and third graders at The Dalton School.

She serves on the Board of Governors for The Broadway League.  She is an Emeritus member of the Syracuse University Board of Trustees, and a past Board member of The Dalton School.  Tepper is also a member of the Juilliard Drama Council and has been listed in Crain’s 40 under 40 and was one of Cosmopolitan’s Fun Fearless Females.

Production credits

References

External links

 Tepper Semester

Living people
Year of birth missing (living people)
Businesspeople from New York City
Syracuse University alumni
American theatre managers and producers